BPSU may refer to:
 Bataan Peninsula State University, Philippines
 Bermuda Public Services Association, a trade union in Bermuda
 Bristol Polytechnic Students' Union, the former name of the University of the West of England Students' Union
 British Paediatric Surveillance Unit, a national team for the study of uncommon childhood infections and disorders